Sarcosoma is a genus of fungi in the family Sarcosomataceae. The genus, widespread in north temperate and tropical areas, contains 16 species. The anamorph (asexual) form is the genus Verticicladium.

Ecology and habitat
The type species for the genus, Sarcosoma globosum, occurs in temperate regions and typically inhabits flooded soil and areas in connection to rivers and brooks. It has most of its localities situated in Sweden (122 out of 135 known localities). Sarcosoma globosum is listed as vulnerable by the Swedish red list.

Traits
The type species has large round/cylindrical fruiting bodies (5–12 cm in width). The disc is blackish-brown, is filled with a gelatinous substance and has a velvety exterior.

Placement in the tree of life
Based on an analysis using Maximum Parsimony on two different genes (ITS and 18S ribosomal RNA), Sarcosoma is placed as follows in relation to other genera in the family Sarcosomataceae:

Species
There are 16 species belonging to the genus Sarcosoma , according to the Catalogue of Life.

 Sarcosoma carolinianum
 Sarcosoma decaryi
 Sarcosoma espeletiae
 Sarcosoma fibula
 Sarcosoma globosum
 Sarcosoma godronioides
 Sarcosoma le-ratii
 Sarcosoma moelleriana
 Sarcosoma novoguineense
 Sarcosoma orientale
 Sarcosoma sarasinii
 Sarcosoma tetrasporum
 Sarcosoma turbinatum
 Sarcosoma umbrinum
 Sarcosoma wettsteinii
 Sarcosoma zelandicum

References

Pezizales
Pezizales genera